The Open Physics Abstraction Layer (OPAL) is an open source realtime physics engine API similar to PAL. It is currently supported only by ODE, but can be extended to run off of other engines. OPAL is free software, released under both the LGPL and the BSD license. It was originally designed and written by Tyler Streeter, Andres Reinot, and Alan Fischer while working at Iowa State University's Virtual Reality Applications Center (VRAC).

OPAL is a high-level interface for low-level physics engines used in games, robotics simulations, and other 3D applications. Features a simple C++ API, intuitive objects (e.g. Solids, Joints, Motors, Sensors), and XML-based file storage for complex objects.

The latest version of OPAL is 0.4.0. On June 23, 2010, OPAL development officially ended.

External links
The official OPAL site

References

Computer physics engines